{{DISPLAYTITLE:C25H25NO4}}
The molecular formula C25H25NO4 (molar mass: 403.47 g/mol, exact mass: 403.1784 u) may refer to:

 Benzhydrocodone
 7-Spiroindanyloxymorphone (SIOM)